Kjell Kaspersen (born 7 April 1939) is a former footballer from Norway. For many years he was goalkeeper for Skeid and the Norwegian national team. He was league champion in 1966, and was elected Player of the Year by Verdens Gang in 1964.

Kaspersen was capped 34 times for Norway. In a friendly match versus Thailand in 1965 he scored from a penalty kick, thereby being the only goalkeeper to score for Norway.

He was married to Swedish singer Lill-Babs between 1969 and 1973. Their daughter is Swedish TV personality Kristin Kaspersen.

References

1939 births
Living people
Norwegian footballers
Norway international footballers
Skeid Fotball players
Association football goalkeepers